Rubén Dario Maldonado Brizuela (born 29 April 1979 in Asunción) is a former Paraguayan football defender who last played for Nacional in the Paraguayan Primera División.

He made his Italian Serie A debut on 11 March 2000, against Bologna F.C. 1909.

Maldonado was part of the Paraguay national under-20 football team that participated in the 1999 FIFA World Youth Championship he has since gone on to represent Paraguay at senior international level.

Maldonado signed for the team where he was "born in soccer", Club Olimpia. He took part of the squad in the second half of the 2010 season, the Clausura 2010 in Paraguay.

External links

 Argentine Primera statistics

1979 births
Living people
Paraguayan footballers
Paraguay international footballers
Paraguay under-20 international footballers
Club Olimpia footballers
Cosenza Calcio 1914 players
Venezia F.C. players
S.S.C. Napoli players
Club de Gimnasia y Esgrima La Plata footballers
Sportivo Carapeguá footballers
Boca Unidos footballers
Club Guaraní players
Club Nacional footballers
Paraguayan Primera División players
Serie A players
Serie B players
Argentine Primera División players
Paraguayan expatriate footballers
Paraguayan expatriate sportspeople in Italy
Expatriate footballers in Italy
Expatriate footballers in Argentina
Association football defenders
Sportspeople from Asunción